Altcar Rifle Range railway station was a railway station on the Liverpool, Crosby and Southport Railway, situated a third of a mile north of Hightown, Merseyside.

History
It opened in 1862 as Hightown Rifle Station, and was renamed in July 1886. The station served the nearby Altcar Rifle Range, and a small tramway was used to transport munitions from the bay platform to the firing ranges. The station was closed briefly between c. October 1893 and c. April 1894, before permanent closure on 3 October 1921, too early to be affected by the Grouping of 1923.

The station was opened by the Lancashire and Yorkshire Railway on the line of the former Liverpool, Crosby and Southport Railway.

The site today
The line through the station remains open and is today used by trains on the Merseyrail Northern Line.

References

 
 Gahan, John W. (1985). Seaport to Seaside, page 87. Countyvise Limited, and Avon AngliA Publications, .

External links
 Station on navigable O.S. map Disused station north of Hightown

Disused railway stations in the Metropolitan Borough of Sefton
Former Lancashire and Yorkshire Railway stations
Railway stations in Great Britain opened in 1862
Railway stations in Great Britain closed in 1921
1862 establishments in England